Dunfermline Athletic Football Club is a Scottish football club based in the city of Dunfermline, Fife. Founded in 1885, the club currently play in Scottish League One after being relegated from the 2021–22 Scottish Championship. Dunfermline play at East End Park, are nicknamed The Pars and are currently managed by James McPake.

The Pars' most successful period was in the 1960s, when the side won the Scottish Cup twice, in 1961 and 1968 under the management of Jock Stein and George Farm respectively. The club regularly played European football in this period, reaching the semi-finals of the 1968–69 European Cup Winners' Cup under Farm.

The club have played at East End Park since their formation in 1885; however, the pitch they initially played at – also known as East End Park – was slightly west of the present stadium.

After a period of relative success in the 2000s marked by appearances in three major finals (the 2004 Scottish Cup Final, the 2006 Scottish League Cup Final and the 2007 Scottish Cup Final), all of which were lost against Celtic. Dunfermline were relegated to the First Division in 2007. The club then encountered financial problems and, in April 2013, applied for and was granted full administration at the Court of Session in Edinburgh, and in October 2013, the fan group Pars United assumed control of the club.

History

Beginning (1885–1959)

Dunfermline Football Club was formed in 1874, when members of Dunfermline Cricket Club decided to establish a football section, with the intention of maintaining fitness during the winter. A dispute over club membership caused some members to split away from Dunfermline Cricket Club, which resulted in the creation of Dunfermline Athletic Football Club on 2 June 1885. The club became the principal football club in Dunfermline and their first twenty-five years saw them compete primarily as an amateur team, until they turned professional in 1899. The club first entered into the Scottish Football League in 1912 where they took part in the Scottish Division Two. The fifty years following the club's admittance to the SFL saw little success, with the side most frequently playing in the second tier, with occasional appearances in the top flight.

Stein and Farm (1960–1970)
Dunfermline's finest period came during the sixties. After being appointed manager on 14 March 1960 and saving the club from relegation to Scottish Division Two, Jock Stein – in his first managerial appointment – guided the Pars to their first major piece of silverware, winning the Scottish Cup in 1961 after just thirteen months in charge.

The years which followed saw Dunfermline consistently competing in European competitions, reaching the semi-finals of the 1968–69 European Cup Winners' Cup under George Farm. Although they lost by one goal on aggregate to eventual winners Slovan Bratislava, it remains the greatest achievement in Dunfermline's history. This followed Farm managing Dunfermline to their second Scottish Cup victory, winning the competition in 1968.

Since 1970
After a period of decline during the 1970s and much of the 1980s, the club returned to the top tier in 1987 under club legend Jim Leishman, although they were subsequently relegated after just one season. The following years saw a similar pattern, with a handful of promotions and relegations throughout the 1990s. It was during this period that the club were rocked by the loss of club captain Norrie McCathie, who died on 8 January 1996 by carbon monoxide poisoning.

The appointment of John Yorkston as chairman and the involvement of Gavin Masterton in 1999 saw the club enter a period of resurgence, with two Scottish Cup final appearances in 2004 and 2007, a Scottish League Cup final in 2006, as well as two short-lived excursions in the UEFA Cup in 2004 and 2007. In 2012 it emerged that the club had a number of outstanding tax bills with HMRC following the financial mismanagement of the football club by Yorkston and Masterton. The club were put into administration on 11 April 2013 and after a points deduction, were relegated to the third tier for the first time since 1986.

The club were then taken over by the fans group Pars United, and after three years in the League One, eventually won promotion back to the Scottish Championship under manager Allan Johnston. Former striker Stevie Crawford was appointed head coach at the beginning of 2019, following a restructure that introduced Jackie McNamara as technical consultant and Greg Shields as assistant head coach.

The club launched its Hall of Fame in 2004, initially with nine inductees. 50 individuals (ranging from players and managers to kit managers and the club historian) and two team groups (the 1960s cup winners) were members as of 2019.

Colours and badge

For much of Dunfermline's history their home colours have been black and white striped shirts, with black shorts and black socks, though recently they have worn white shorts and white socks. From the club's formation in 1885 until 1901, the club's home colours were a plain maroon shirt with either navy or white shorts and either maroon, white or grey socks. The club then went through a period between 1901 and 1909 when their kits were blue. The club first wore their now well-known black-and-white-striped shirts in 1909 and have worn these colours every year apart from the 1971–72 season, when they wore all white, the 2004–05 season, when they wore a white shirt with a single black stripe running down the left side of the shirt and during the 2007–08 season, in which they wore an all-white shirt with black shorts and white socks. For the 2008–09 season, the Pars reverted to their well-known black-and-white stripes resembling the kit they wore for the 1997–98 and 1998–99 seasons.

Conversely, there has been no consistent colour or design of the club's away strips. Since the start of the new millennium, the club have most regularly had red kits of varying design; for example, the 2004–2005 away strip consisted of vertical red and black lines, whereas the 2016–17 kit was mostly red, with four horizontal lines of red, white and black across the chest. However, away kit designs have not been exclusively red, with the club having also had kits of purple, blue and yellow, as well as black, as was the case during the 2005–06 season.

The current Dunfermline Athletic club badge design was created in 1957 by Colin Dymock, an art teacher at Dunfermline High School. It was allegedly inspired by one of Dymock's mysterious nightmares. The "DAFC" represents the initials of the club, Dunfermline Athletic Football Club, whilst the tower is a representation of Malcolm Canmore's Tower. The tower was adopted by the town of Dunfermline to be used for the Burgh Arms and old seals. Malcolm Canmore was King of Scotland from 1057 to 1093, and made his residence in Dunfermline within what is now Pittencrieff Park. The park is represented by the stormy, ghostly blue and black night scene behind the tower, including the park's infamous hanging tree. The green area at the bottom of the crest is meant to represent the club's stadium, East End Park. Whilst the badge has been in use since the 1950s, it has undergone a number of alterations since its original incarnation, with the most recent adjustments in 2011 altering the outlines, font and colours of the logo.

Nickname

According to Black and White Magic, a 1984 book about the club by Jim Paterson and Douglas Scott, there are numerous theories as to the origin of the club's nickname, the Pars. The authors wrote:

"Most tend to confirm the more common belief that the name arose from the team's parallel striped shirts, their drinking habits or their style of play. The latter were both described as "paralytic". The earliest theory claims that in the early days when the Football Club was closely connected with the Cricket Club, the footballers were renowned for their performances at the bar and so were called the "Paralytics".

However, in the early 1900s it is known that Athletic's nickname was the "Dumps" – shortened from Dunfermline – and this is said to have been coined by English sailors visiting East End Park when their ship docked at Rosyth. After World War I they were known as the Pars and some believe the parallel black and white stripes to be the reason.
Another school of thought involves English workers who came to work at the armaments depot at Crombie and at Rosyth Dockyard; they kept their association with their local team by forming the Plymouth Argyle (Rosyth) Supporters Club and it is said that the Dunfermline nickname comes from the banners in evidence around the ground."

Another view, which holds water with the older supporters is that the name derives from the word 'Parr' which is a juvenile salmon with dark vertical markings.

Club culture

Songs
Like other football clubs, Dunfermline has a number of songs and anthems. A popular song, and the anthem to which the team runs out is "Into The Valley" by local band "The Skids".
Since the 1950s the crowd have left the ground after the game to the tune of "The Bluebell Polka" by Jimmy Shand and his band. After Dunfermline score a goal at East End Park, the chorus of The Dave Clark Five's Glad All Over is played.

Rivalries

Dunfermline Athletic have traditional rivalries with local sides Cowdenbeath and Raith Rovers as well as contesting the Kincardine Derby with near neighbours, Falkirk. They have also participated regularly in the Fife Cup since their formation in 1885, winning the competition more than thirty times, most recently during the 2006–07 season.

In popular culture
In the STV television detective drama Taggart, the writer and Dunfermline fan, Stuart Hepburn used the names of the 1968 Scottish cup winning side for the characters in a 2003 episode.

Notable managers and players

Managers
 George Farm; FA Cup winner in 1953 with Blackpool; Scotland international goalkeeper who managed Dunfermline to their highest achievement, the semi-finals of the European Cup Winners' Cup during the 1968–69 season.
 Jim Leishman; former player and manager for the club, currently Provost of Fife.
 Jock Stein; former manager of the club and former manager of Celtic and the Scotland national team.

Players
 Owen Coyle; former player, former manager of Bolton Wanderers, Wigan Athletic, Houston Dynamo and Blackburn Rovers.
 Alex Ferguson; former player and former manager of Manchester United.
 Norrie McCathie; club captain who had played for Dunfermline Athletic for 15 years. Died whilst with the club and has a stand at East End Park stadium named after him.
 David Moyes; former player, former manager of Everton, Manchester United, Real Sociedad, Sunderland, and West Ham United.

Players

First-team squad

On loan

Club captains since 1985

 Fordyce was initially appointed club captain for the 2015–16 season, however, after suffering a severe leg-break in September 2015, Andy Geggan was given the captain's armband for the remainder of the season. The two are considered co-captains for the season, with both having lifted the Scottish League One trophy together at the end of the season.

Management

Club officials

Backroom staff

Board of directors

Managers

Achievements

Honours

Major honours
Scottish Cup :
Winners (2): 1960–61, 1967–68
Runners-up (3): 1964–65, 2003–04, 2006–07
Scottish League Cup:
Runners-up (3): 1949–50, 1991–92, 2005–06

Minor honours
Scottish Championship, second tier:
Champions (4):  1925–26, 1988–89, 1995–96, 2010–11
Runners-up (9): 1912–13, 1933–34, 1954–55, 1957–58, 1972–73, 1986–87, 1993–94, 1994–95, 1999–2000
Scottish League One, third tier:
Champions (2): 1985–86, 2015–16
Runners-up (2): 1978–79, 2013–14
Scottish Challenge Cup:
Runners-up (1): 2007–08

Club records
Highest home attendance: 27,816 vs Celtic, 30 April 1968
Highest home European attendance: 26,000 vs West Brom, European Cup Winners' Cup quarter-finals, 15 January 1969
Biggest league win: 11–2 vs. Stenhousemuir, 1930
Biggest league defeat: 10–0 vs. Dundee, 22 March 1947
Biggest all-time defeat: 17–2 vs. Clackmannan, Midland League, 1891
Most capped player: Andrius Skerla, 84 for Lithuania 2000–2005
Most appearances: Norrie McCathie, 576 (497 league), 1981–1996
Most career goals: Charlie Dickson, 212 (154 league), 1955–1964
Record transfer fee paid: £540,000 to Girondins de Bordeaux for Istvan Kozma, 9 August 1989
Record transfer fee received: £650,000 from Celtic for Jackie McNamara, 4 October 1995

European record

See also
McCrae's Battalion

References

External links

Official Club website
Dunfermline Athletic BBC My Club page
Historical Kits

 
Football clubs in Scotland
Association football clubs established in 1885
Scottish Premier League teams
1885 establishments in Scotland
Scottish Football League teams
Scottish Cup winners
Scottish Professional Football League teams
Football clubs in Fife
Companies that have entered administration in the United Kingdom